Cle "Bone" Shaheed Sloan (born May 22, 1969) is an American activist, actor and documentary director from Los Angeles County, California. While still a member of Athens Park Bloods, a Los Angeles street gang, Sloan worked to reform gang culture to put an end to gang violence from the inside.

Career
Sloan was introduced to the film industry by football legend Jim Brown, who helped him secure a job as an assistant when he was released from prison. The job allowed Sloan to meet director Antoine Fuqua and sparked his interest in becoming a cinematographer. Sloan has since appeared in small roles in three of Fuqua's hit movies Training Day, Tears of the Sun, and Brooklyn's Finest. During the production of Training Day, Sloan worked as a gang adviser and helped persuade actual gang members to lend their credibility to the project on-screen.

Sloan directed and appears in the 2006 documentary film Bastards of the Party which appeared at the 2005 Tribeca Film Festival and at the 2006 Hollywood Black Film Festival. Bastards of the Party aired on HBO on February 6, 2007.

Sloan was featured on Bill O'Reilly's The O'Reilly Factor and Anderson Cooper 360° speaking out against gang violence on behalf of his non profit organization AKTIVE which is helping to "Change the gangs from the inside" by working with active gang members in communities nationwide.

Sloan starred in three of David Ayer's directorial efforts, the Los Angeles films 2008's Street Kings featuring Forest Whitaker and Keanu Reeves, and End of Watch, a 2012 film about the life of two LAPD officers (Jake Gyllenhaal and Michael Peña), and 2020's The Tax Collector about a LA drug gang enforcer and his family. He later appeared on the TNT Drama Southland as Ronnie, a Los Angeles pimp.

Personal life
On January 29, 2015, Sloan and Terry Carter were struck by a truck in a hit-and-run incident in Compton, California. The accident, caused by Suge Knight, killed Carter and injured Sloan. Though Sloan refused "to be used as a snitch" and testify against Knight, on September 21, 2018, Knight pleaded no contest to manslaughter and was sentenced to 28 years in prison.

Filmography

References

External links

 NPR with Cle "Bone" Sloan
 LA Weekly interview with Cle "Bone" Sloan

Living people
American documentary film directors
American male film actors
Bloods
African-American male actors
1969 births
21st-century African-American people
20th-century African-American people